Kureekkad is a census town in Ernakulam district in the Indian state of Kerala.

Demographics
 India census, Kureekkad had a population of 9730. Males constitute 49% of the population and females 51%. Kureekkad has an average literacy rate of 86%, higher than the national average of 59.5%: male literacy is 87%, and female literacy is 85%. In Kureekkad, 10% of the population is under 6 years of age.

References

Cities and towns in Ernakulam district